The 3rd Alberta Legislative Assembly was in session from September 16, 1913, to April 5, 1917, with the membership of the assembly determined by the results of the 1913 Alberta general election held on April 17, 1913. The Legislature officially resumed on September 16, 1913, and continued until the fifth session was prorogued on April 17, 1917 and dissolved on May 14, 1917, prior to the 1917 Alberta general election.

Alberta's second government was controlled by the majority Liberal Party led by Premier Arthur Sifton. The Official Opposition was the Conservative Party led by Edward Michener. The Speaker was Charles W. Fisher who continued in the role from the 1st and 2nd assembly, and would serve in the role until his death from the 1918 flu pandemic in 1919.

The total number of seats in the assembly was increased from 41 contested in the 1913 election to 56.

The standings changed little during the 3rd legislature only 4 by-elections 3 of which resulted in the return of new members and no floor crossings occurred.

Bills
During the fifth sitting of the 3rd Legislature, the Assembly would pass An Act amending The Election Act respecting Members of the Legislative Assembly on Active Service (Bill 58) which acclaimed members of the assembly in the 1917 election who were serving in armed forces during the First World War. The Act listed eleven members of the assembly and provided those members were deemed nominated and elected as a member of the 4th Alberta Legislature. The bill was assented to on April 5, 1917.

Sitting dates
1st session September 16, 1913 - October 25, 1913
2nd session October 7, 1914 - October 22, 1914
3rd session February 25, 1915 - April 17, 1915
4th session February 24, 1916 - April 19, 1916
5th session February 6, 1917 - April 5, 1917

Members election in the 1913 general election

Cabinet

Private members

By-elections

Other membership changes 
 September 29, 1916 – The Coronation constituency was left vacant after Liberal Frank H. Whiteside was shot and killed.
 June 14, 1916 – The Lac Ste. Anne  constituency was left vacant after Liberal Peter Gunn resigned from the Legislature and appointed as the sheriff of the judicial district of Athabasca.

References

Further reading

External links
Alberta Legislative Assembly
Legislative Assembly of Alberta Members Book
By-elections 1905 to present

03